Maiestas hesperidium is a species of bugs from the Cicadellidae family that is endemic to Cape Verde. It was formerly placed within Recilia, but a 2009 revision moved it to Maiestas.

References

External links

Insects described in 1958
Endemic fauna of Cape Verde
Insects of Africa
Maiestas